Battle for Life is a nature documentary series made from 1932 until 1934 by Horace Woodard and Stacy Woodard, The short films include the 1935 Oscar award-winning City of Wax, about honey bees. The one-reel short films were released by Educational Pictures. A homemade camera setup for closeups was used. The Woodards followed the series with another series titled Struggle to Live.

Battle for Life films were made with specially designed cameras.

Filmography
Beneath Our Feet (1933)
City of Wax (1934)

City of Wax
City of Wax is a 1934 American short documentary film produced by Horace and Stacy Woodard about the life of a bee. It won the Oscar at the 7th Academy Awards in 1935 for Best Short Subject (Novelty). The Academy Film Archive preserved City of Wax in 2007.

References

External links

1934 films
1934 documentary films
1934 short films
1930s short documentary films
American documentary films
Black-and-white documentary films
Live Action Short Film Academy Award winners
American black-and-white films
Documentary films about bees
1930s English-language films
1930s American films